Hell Bent for Leather may refer to:

 Hell Bent for Leather! (or simply Hell Bent for Leather), a 1962 album by Frankie Laine
 Hell Bent for Leather, the US title of the Judas Priest album Killing Machine, 1978
 "Hell Bent for Leather" (song), the title song of the US version
 Hell Bent for Leather (Milan the Leather Boy album), 2009
 Hell Bent for Leather (film), a 1960 western starring Audie Murphy

See also
 Hell Bent Forever: A Tribute to Judas Priest, a 2008 tribute album
 Hell Bent for Letters, a 2006 album by BlöödHag